The Islamabad–Rawalpindi metropolitan area (Urdu:) is 3rd largest metropolitan area of Pakistan after Karachi and Lahore. It consists of the twin cities of Islamabad and Rawalpindi

Covering the Pothohar platu, the area consists of the colonial city of Rawalpindi and the modern planned city of Islamabad. The region received a major boom with the construction of Islamabad as the capital city of Pakistan in the 1960s.

Geography
Islamabad and Rawalpindi are located in the Potohar Plateau in north of Punjab, against the backdrop of the Margalla Hills.

Economy 

Islamabad is a net contributor to the Pakistani economy, as whilst having only 0.8% of the country's population, it contributes 1% to the country's GDP. Islamabad Stock Exchange, founded in 1989, is Pakistan's third largest stock exchange after Karachi Stock Exchange and Lahore Stock Exchange, and was merged to form Pakistan Stock Exchange. The exchange had 118 members with 104 corporate bodies and 18 individual members. The average daily turnover of the stock exchange is over 1 million shares.

, Islamabad LTU (Large Tax Unit) was responsible for Rs 371 billion in tax revenue, which amounts to 20% of all the revenue collected by Federal Board of Revenue. Islamabad has seen an expansion in information and communications technology with the addition two Software Technology Parks, which house numerous national and foreign technological and information technology companies. The tech parks are located in Evacuee Trust Complex and Awami Markaz. Awami Markaz houses 36 IT companies while Evacuee Trust house 29 companies.

The economy of Rawalpindi and the surrounding district has a diverse industrial base, but remains mainly service based. According to the general survey of industry conducted by Directorate of Industries and Mineral Development Punjab, there are 939 industrial units operating in the district. This district is not famous for industrial goods like other districts. The progress has been mostly in the private sector. The existing industrial units provide employment to about 35,000 people, i.e., about 1.6% of the district's population is directly employed in large, medium and small industrial units. The Technical/Vocational Training Institute operating in the district turns out about 1,974 technicians/artisans annually, trained in engineering, air conditioning, drafting, metallurgy, welding, automated knitting, telecom and commerce, etc. Jinnah Road, formerly known as City Saddar Road, is one of the busiest business markets. It could be considered as the business headquarters of northern Pakistan; including retailers, wholesalers, distributors, and manufacturers, it comprises daily cash flow of approximately more than 1 billion rupees . The importance of Jinnah Road can be seen by the presence of more than nine banks on the road with more opening soon. Being an expensive city, the prices of most of fruits, vegetable and poultry items increased in Islamabad during the years 2015-2020

Infrastructure 
The metro area is connected by a network of highways to the rest of the country. Within the metro area the Islamabad Highway and Srinagar Highway provide the primary link between Islamabad and Rawalpindi. The area is divided by the Grand Trunk Road which connect's the region with Lahore and Peshawar. The newer, M2 Motorway contact's the area with Lahore, and through Lahore with the port city of Karachi.

The area is also connected to the Pakistan Railway's national railway network. The area is served by Islamabad International Airport which is one of the largest airports in Pakistan, it has a capacity of serving 9 million passengers per year which can be increased to up to 25 million. The Civil Aviation Authority has plans to acquire more land for the development of a third runway. It is the only airport in Pakistan capable of landing the Airbus A380. The Rawalpindi-Islamabad Metrobus is a 24 km (14.9 mi) bus rapid transit system that serves the twin cities of Rawalpindi and Islamabad within the larger metropolitan area. It uses dedicated bus lanes for all of its routes covering 24 bus stations.

Politics
As Pakistan's capital city, Islamabad serves as the seat of the federal government and is the country's political center. Rawalpindi has remained important historically, as it hosts the headquarters of Pakistan's military. Rawalpindi also temporarily served as the federal capital when Islamabad was being built in the 1960s, to replace Karachi as the capital.

Demographics 

|Kahuta
|Punjab
|220000
|Town
|}

References 

Metropolitan areas of Pakistan
Geography of Islamabad
Rawalpindi District